Dahlia  is a fictional character from The Southern Vampire Mysteries/Sookie Stackhouse Series by author Charlaine Harris.
However, she only appears briefly in the novels and the only time she appears on the same page as Sookie Stackhouse is in All Together Dead.
Dahlia is the main character in a computer game and in a growing number of non-Sookie-related—though set in the same fictional universe—short stories. 
She is a vampire and lives in the city of Rhodes, Iowa.

It is mentioned in Bacon that her original name was too difficult to spell and pronounce for people of the twentieth century so around 1925 she changed it to 'Dahlia' for her own convenience.
In 1940, staying in London during the Blitz, Dahlia adopted a surname to get new papers. Since that time her full name has been Dahlia Lynley-Chivers.

In Dahlia Underground she tells humans that she "perhaps" has been a vampire for 900 years, but it is repeatedly said that she is very old, even ancient.

There are a few more hints about her actual age. For example, she considers her knowledge of some no-longer-spoken languages to be really advantageous. It is also said (in the same short story) that her friend Thalia, who is also originally from Greece and even older than Dahlia, is so ancient that she came across Odysseus "a time or two".

Human life
Dahlia is Greek, and that is almost the only thing known about her origins.
As a little girl she shared a tutor with her brother, but that stopped after it was decided that a girl didn't need any more education.
She was brought over (made a vampire) at the age of 18.

Physical description
Dahlia is petite and beautiful.  Sookie thinks that the vampire has got "the straightest back and longest rippling black hair" she has ever seen (All Together Dead).

Dahlia has large green eyes (Tacky)
and her face is described either as round or as heart-shaped.
Dahlia is quite small: 4 feet 9 inches tall (A Very Vampire Christmas).

She wears stilettos whenever possible and is very particular about her clothes.

She possesses the rare ability to fly—an ability shared by her nestmate Glenda (Tacky) and Sookie's vampire husband Eric, Sheriff of Area Five in Louisiana.

Personality and traits
Sookie sees Dahlia as very "direct in her judgement". She also mentions that Dahlia behaves "regally" in the company of the Queen Sophie-Anne.
Dahlia is supremely confident in her strength, wits and lethality. She is usually very composed and has a violent, vengeful nature. Dahlia is seen smiling only rarely (usually before a good battle), but she has got a dark sense of humor. Immediately after her husband's death she experiences difficulties with controlling her temper.

Relationships
In The Sookie Stackhouse Companion
,
it is said that Dahlia "loves her men and her high-heels".
Readers always witness Dahlia either involved in a romantic relationship or eager to get involved. In spite of her pronounced disgust with the non-vampiric, she is equally ready to notice strength, courage and physical beauty in all males:
vamps, "breathers" and Weres.

In Tacky, she meets her future husband, Todd,
a werewolf, a second-in-command in the Swift-Foot pack. After about two years of happiness Todd is murdered and avenged by Dahlia.

In A Very Vampire Christmas, a reader sees her dating Matsudo Katamori, a vampire.

Dahlia has got a vampire best friend, Taffy, married to Don Swiftfoot, a werewolf packleader. It is said in Tacky that Taffy and Dahlia have been friends for about two centuries and share a lot of memories.
Dahlia is the maid of honour at Taffy and Don's wedding and is responsible for security on the bride's side.

After mutually saving each other's lives in Dahlia Underground Dahlia sort of befriends firefighters of Thirty-four Company.

Position within the vampire hierarchy
The nature of her occupation is not mentioned, but she tells her husband-to-be, Todd, that she does her nest leader's bidding and contributes to his wealth.
The nest leader and vampire sheriff of Rhodes is Cedric Deeming.

By the time readers first meet Dahlia in Tacky
she has lived under his rule for about 20 years and plays the role of the nest reinforcer.

Dahlia is respected enough among vampires to be on a judges' panel (that also includes Bill Compton and an unidentified blond vampire) at the vampire summit in Rhodes in All Together Dead. After the explosions at the 'Pyramid of Gizeh' hotel (Dahlia Underground), Dahlia and her friend Taffy are appointed by Cedric to conduct the investigation.

In the Dying for Daylight game, Dahlia once again performs as an investigator. Later, in Death by Dahlia, she and former policeman Matsuda Katamori are chosen by Joaquin, the new sheriff, for yet another investigation.

Dahlia's timeline
 Tacky
Starts two weeks before Taffy's wedding, ends almost a year later with Dalia and Todd's wedding.
 Bacon
Takes place about a year after Tacky, starts ~ half a month after Todd's death.
 All Together Dead, Chapter 16
24 September 2005 (according to Sookieverse timeline). Dahlia takes part at vampire trials as a judge.
 Dahlia Underground
Starts on 25 September 2005 (according to Sookieverse timeline), after the sunset.
 Dying for Daylight (computer game)
Cedric is still the Sheriff of Rhodes.
 Death by Dahlia
 Introduces the new vampire sheriff of Rhodes and Dahlia's new lover. Takes place six years after the Great Revelation so it can be dated by summer 2008 (according to Sookieverse timeline). This clashes severely with the date given for the seemingly next Christmas story.

7. A Very Vampire Christmas
Takes place approximately on 17 December 2006 (it is said that it's a year since the events of 'Dahlia Underground'). Besides everything else, it describes new rules introduced by the new Sheriff.

Dying For Daylight computer game

Game description
The game was developed by Nikitova Games under the supervision of famous game-designer Jane Jensen and released on February 11, 2011, by I-play. Charlaine Harris herself interfered the creation of Dahlia's looks and "picked the story" I-play used. The theme song "Young Goodman" was written by Robert Holmes and performed by his band "The Scarlet Furies". Tony Leamer, I-play VP of Marketing, says in an interview that the game is "much more adventure than hidden object" search.
The released first part of Dahlia's computer-based quest consists of four sequential episodes. Four more episodes are yet to come in the second part of the game, and according to Mr.Leamer the mystery will be unravelled in the very last one.

Plot
A vampire has been noticed in public during the daytime. Dahlia is given (by her sheriff Cedric Deeming) a special task to find a legendary potion which allows vampires to day-walk without being burnt into ashes. Dahlia herself is interested in solving the mystery because the fashion conscious ancient vampire dreams of shopping at Tiffany's during the day. To fulfill the task she has to go to the Vampire Quarter in New Orleans and investigate the strange events happening there. It appears that all hell has broken loose and a lot of vampires have ended up "finally dead".

References

Fictional vampires
Fictional characters with superhuman durability or invulnerability
Fictional characters with superhuman strength
Fictional characters who can move at superhuman speeds
Fictional characters with accelerated healing
Fictional Greek people
Literary characters introduced in 2007
The Southern Vampire Mysteries characters